Bucksnort is a spring in Hickman County, Tennessee, United States, located on Sugar Creek,  downstream of the confluence of the South Fork of Sugar Creek,  to the south-east of Exit 152 on Interstate 40, and  west of Spot.
There are no U.S. Census statistics for the location and there is no post office.
A trout farm business operated just upstream and adjacent to the I-40 in 1967, operated by Mr. and Mrs. Joda Austin.

According to the county historian, the name Bucksnort comes from a one-time merchant who sold a 'snort' of moonshine for a dollar (buck).

Also at the confluence of Sugar Creek and South Fork (also known as Coleman's Branch) was Lee's Furnace, later to be called Lee's Old Furnace.
It was named after Samuel B. Lee, who together with James Gould bought a large tract of land for mining and timber production in 1830.
It was soon abandoned, as the mineral deposits were found to be located further away from the furnace than was expected, near Vernon.

A Methodist church was established here some time after 1856. 
 This restaurant is no longer here. If ya wanna eat go to 143 (Arby’s, McDonald’s, Loretta lynns kitchen) or 163 (great gas station with McDonald’s attached.) or go on into Dickson. And the little gas station on the exit 152 really ain’t worth stopping. I’m a local and try not to go in there. They always have low supplies, bad milk, and stale everything. No bathroom besides a portajohn

References

Bibliography

 
 
 
 

Further reading 

  — Page 24 has a picture of the Lee furnace.
 

Unincorporated communities in Hickman County, Tennessee
Unincorporated communities in Tennessee